Passionate Kemp  (born 2001) is a Finnish former Standardbred trotter by Lindy Lane out of Sonata Lobell by Mystic Park.

Her most prestigious victories include the  Finnish Trotting Criterium (2004), Gran Premio Orsi Mangelli (2004), Gran Premio Tino Triossi (2005) and the Finnish Trotting Derby (2005). When it, in April 2009, was reported Passionate Kemp's racing career was ended, the mare had earned US$2,383,158 (€1,667,957), an amount that makes her the richest Finnish trotter ever.

Pedigree

References

Finnish Standardbred racehorses
Harness racing in Finland